Danièle Dupré (1927–2015) was a French singer from the 1950s, most notable for representing Luxembourg in the 1957 Eurovision Song Contest with her song Amours mortes (tant de peine) – Faded Love (So Much Pain) – where she finished in a tie for fourth.

A fairly minor star, her recordings occasionally appear on eBay and other places where EPs and 45 RPM singles are sold, and appear occasionally on compilations of 1950s French music.

She spent some time in Brazil as a child. After returning to France, she appeared in a movie, La Parisienne, and went on to receive operatic training. She apparently injured her voice during this training, turning to what was then considered light music.

She toured France, and was invited to perform in the Eurovision contest for Luxembourg. The contest had nowhere near the prestige it has today, and she was ambivalent about the song she was to perform. Like a few performers at the time, she only practiced her song once, at the pre-show rehearsal. At the competition, she met Paule Desjardins, the French contestant, with whom she maintained a long friendship.

Her recordings include several EPs for Polydor that include songs such as "Merci mon Dieu, La chanteuse de blues", "Mon vieux marin" (with the orchestra of Armand Migiani), "Paris-java", "Sarah", "Tu me donnes", "Une femme est jolie", "Mon coeur est un violin", "Marjolaine", "Patricia" and "La gommeuse de 1900".

She retired from the music business in 1958, realizing that rock and roll was eclipsing the music she performed. She turned to interior design, where her most notable work is in the terminal of the São Paulo airport. She gave an interview for the French OGAE (Eurovision fanclub) magazine in 1999 that was later translated into English and published in Eurosong News (the continent-wide OGAE magazine).

She died in 2015 at the age of 88.

References

Sources
La Semaine Radiophonique - 11 November 1957 issue

External links
 

French women singers
Eurovision Song Contest entrants for Luxembourg
Eurovision Song Contest entrants of 1957
2015 deaths
1927 births